3D Crazy Coaster is a video game for the Vectrex console. Released in 1983, 3D Crazy Coaster uses vector graphics to present a 3D ride on a roller coaster. It was originally designed for use with GCE's Imager glasses.

Gameplay 
The user controls the movements of a passenger in the lead car of a roller coaster as it plummets down steep hills and around sharp curves. One goal of the game is to keep the passenger's arms raised throughout the ride without being flung out.

References

External links 
 Two screenshots
 Gameplay video

1983 video games
Vectrex games
Roller coaster games and simulations
Video games developed in the United States
Single-player video games